Al-Islah Mosque is a mosque built in 2015 at Punggol, Singapore. The mosque features modern Islamic architecture.

Masjid Al Islah is located within the densely populated Punggol New Town at 30 Punggol Field, Singapore 828812, at the junction of Punggol Place. The mosque serves the Muslim community in Punggol. On peak periods such as the Friday prayer and Ramadan night prayers, the mosques serves 4,500 worshippers on the 4 levels of the mosque.

Before Masjid Al Islah was built in 2015, the last mosque in Punggol was the Wak Sumang Mosque which was located near Punggol Point.

Unique Features 
Being the 69th mosque built in Singapore, Masjid Al Islah has improved facilities than other mosques in Singapore. Some parts of Masjid Al Islah is opened 24 hours and it does not have any fence unlike other older mosques.  It encourages the Muslim community to do night prayers at Masjid Al Islah therefore there are washing facilities available throughout the day.

As Masjid Al Islah is built in a tropical and humid country, the mosque's architect, Formwerkz Architects incorporated high ceilings in the main prayer hall in order for cool air to enter the mosque's prayer hall.

Transportation
The mosque is accessible from Punggol MRT/LRT station.

See also 
 Islam in Singapore

References

2015 establishments in Singapore
Buildings and structures in Punggol
Mosques completed in 2015
Islah